Abdullah Shafique (Punjabi:عبد اللہ شفیق); born 20 November 1999) is a Pakistani cricketer who plays for the Pakistan national cricket team and for Lahore Qalandars in Pakistan Super League

Early life and family
Shafique was born in a Gujjar family in a local town of district Sialkot, Pakistan. His father Shafiq Ahmed is a long-term resident of Dubai, where he moved in 1991. He was a professional cricketer and later became a cricket coach. His uncle Arshad Ali played international cricket for the United Arab Emirates.

Outside cricket he also enjoys music, himself being a singer and playing the guitar, his covers of different songs having gone viral.

Domestic career
In November 2017, Shafique was bought by Multan Sultans in the 2018 Pakistan Super League players draft but did not play in the competition. 

In December 2019, he made his first-class debut for Central Punjab in the 2019–20 Quaid-e-Azam Trophy, scoring 133 runs. 

In September 2020, he made his Twenty20 debut for Central Punjab in the 2020–21 National T20 Cup, scoring 102 not out. 

As a result, he became the first Pakistani batsman to score a century on his first-class and T20 debut.

In December 2021, Shafique was named in Lahore Qalandar's squad for the 2022 Pakistan Super League season (PSL).

International career
In October 2020, following his performances in the National T20 Cup, he was named in a 22-man squad of "probables" for Pakistan's home series against Zimbabwe. 

In November 2020, he was named in Pakistan's 15-man squad for the third One Day International (ODI) match against Zimbabwe, though he did not play. He made his Twenty20 International (T20I) debut for Pakistan, against Zimbabwe, on 10 November 2020. The same month, he was named in Pakistan's 35-man squad for their tour to New Zealand.

In January 2021, he was named in Pakistan's Test squad for their series against South Africa. 

In March 2021, he was named in Pakistan's One Day International (ODI) squad for their series against South Africa, and their Test squad for their series against Zimbabwe.

In June 2021, Shafique was again named in Pakistan's ODI squad, this time for the series against England. He was also named in Pakistan's Test squad for the series against the West Indies. 

In September 2021, he was named in Pakistan's ODI squad for their series against New Zealand. The following month, he was named in the Pakistan Shaheens squad for their tour of Sri Lanka.

In November 2021, he was named in Pakistan's Test squad for their series against Bangladesh. He made his Test debut on 26 November 2021, for Pakistan against Bangladesh.

In February 2022, Shafique was named in Pakistan's Test squad for the series against Australia. Abdullah Shafique scored his maiden century in the first match's fourth innings. He scored 397 runs during the three Test matches. 

In March 2022, Shafique was named in Pakistan's One Day International (ODI) squad for their series against Australia. 

In May 2022, he was named in Pakistan's ODI squad for the series against the West Indies. 

In July 2022, he was named in Pakistan’s squad for the tour of Sri Lanka. In the fourth innings of the first Test, he scored a historic 160* to win the match in Galle.

In August 2022, he was named in Pakistan's ODI squad, for their tour of the Netherlands. He made his ODI debut on 21 August 2022, for Pakistan, against the Netherlands.

In December 2022, he scored his third Test hundred against England at Rawalpindi.

References

External links 
 

1999 births
Living people
Pakistani cricketers
Pakistan Test cricketers
Pakistan Twenty20 International cricketers
Pakistan One Day International cricketers
Multan Sultans cricketers
Central Punjab cricketers
Cricketers from Sialkot